Radha Mohan Singh (born 1 September 1949) is an Indian politician from Bharatiya Janata Party (BJP). Since September 2020, he has been one of the national vice-presidents of the party. From 2014 to 2019, during the First Modi ministry he served as the Union Minister of Agriculture & Farmers Welfare. Singh was President of BJP's Bihar State unit from 2006 to 2009. He was elected to 9th Lok Sabha (1989), 11th Lok Sabha (1996), 13th Lok Sabha (1999), 15th Lok Sabha (2009), 16th Lok Sabha (2014) and currently is member of 17th Lok Sabha (2019). He is the chairperson for Parliamentary Standing committee on Railways, National Election Officer, BJP & Incharge for UP BJP.

He represents Purvi Champaran constituency in Bihar state. His stature has grown which can be traced by seeing his performance in the previous elections and his outstanding performance as Central minister in Agriculture ministry .

Early life
Since his youth, he has been an active RSS Swayamsevak. He embarked upon a political career after becoming a member of Jan Sangh and BJP.

Social And Cultural Activities
Associated with:
 Vaidyanath Seva Trust
 Rickshaw Chalak Kalyan Samiti, Motihari. Bihar
 Pandit Deen Dayal Upadhayaya Smriti

Parliamentary career
He was first elected as Member of Parliament (MP) in 9th Lok Sabha (1989) & is currently Member of Parliament in 17th Lok Sabha (2019).

|-

|-

|-

|-

See also

List of politicians from Bihar

References

External links

1949 births
Living people
India MPs 1989–1991
India MPs 1996–1997
India MPs 1999–2004
India MPs 2009–2014
People from East Champaran district
Lok Sabha members from Bihar
India MPs 2014–2019
Bharatiya Janata Party politicians from Bihar
Narendra Modi ministry
People from Motihari
Bihari politicians
Babasaheb Bhimrao Ambedkar Bihar University alumni
India MPs 2019–present
Agriculture Ministers of India
Indian Hindus